Debbie Chase (born 29 July 1966) is a former rugby union player. She debuted for the Black Ferns against the Netherlands at the RugbyFest 1990. She led the first haka to be performed by a women's team at the 1991 Women's Rugby World Cup.

Career 
Chase has represented New Zealand in three different codes; rugby union, rugby league and softball. She has also represented Canterbury in athletics, volleyball, basketball, rugby sevens, football and volleyball.

In 1998, she was a part of the Kiwi Ferns that beat a touring Great Britain in a three test series.

References

External links 

 Black Ferns Profile

1966 births
Living people
New Zealand female rugby union players
New Zealand women's international rugby union players
People from Kawerau
Rugby union players from the Bay of Plenty Region